Angiostrongylidae is a family of nematodes belonging to the order Rhabditida.

Genera:
 Aelurostrongylus Cameron, 1927
 Chabaudistrongylus Kontramavichus, 1979
 Gallegostrongylus Mas-Coma, 1978
 Rodentocaulus Schulz, Orlov & Kutass, 1933
 Sobolevingylus Romanov, 1952
 Stefanskostrongylus Drozdz, 1970

References

Nematodes